Siniša Stevanović (Serbian Cyrillic: Синиша Стевановић; born 12 January 1989) is a Serbian professional footballer who plays as a right-back.

Club career
A product of Partizan's youth system, Stevanović made his senior team debut with their affiliated club Teleoptik, before being promoted to Partizan's first team in the summer of 2009. He was loaned to Spartak Subotica in January 2010, before signing a permanent contract with the club in the summer of 2010.

In January 2014, Stevanović moved to another Superliga club Novi Pazar.

In the 2016 winter transfer window, Stevanović left Novi Pazar and moved to Bosnian Premier League club Željezničar. He won his first trophy with Željezničar in the 2017–18 season, the Bosnian Cup. On 24 June 2019, Stevanović extended his contract with Željezničar, which is due to keep him at the club until the summer of 2021. On 27 July 2019, in a 0–2 away league win against Mladost Doboj Kakanj, he made his 100th appearance for Željezničar. Stevanović scored his first official goal for Željezničar on 9 November 2020, in a league game against Borac Banja Luka. On 16 February 2021, he again extended his contract with Željezničar until June 2022. However, in June 2021, Stevanović decided to terminate his contract with the club, leaving Željezničar after five years.

International career
Between 2009 and 2010, Stevanović represented Serbia at under-21 level, making nine appearances.

Career statistics

Club

Honours
Željezničar
Bosnian Cup: 2017–18

References

External links
Siniša Stevanović at Sofascore

1989 births
Living people
Footballers from Belgrade
Serbian footballers
Serbia under-21 international footballers
Association football defenders
FK Novi Pazar players
FK Partizan players
FK Spartak Subotica players
FK Teleoptik players
FK Željezničar Sarajevo players
Serbian SuperLiga players
Premier League of Bosnia and Herzegovina players
Serbian expatriate footballers
Expatriate footballers in Bosnia and Herzegovina
Serbian expatriate sportspeople in Bosnia and Herzegovina